Vercors may refer to:

Places 
 Vercors Cave System, a set of long caves in the Alps of South-Eastern France
 Vercors Massif, a range of mountains and plateaus in the departments of Isère and Drome, French Alps
 Vercors Regional Natural Park, a protected area of southeastern France

Other 
 Maquis du Vercors, a section of the French Resistance to the Germans and Vichy régime during World War II, active in the district
 Free Republic of Vercors (June-July 1944), a short lived Free government established by the French Resistance
 Vercors, a pen name adopted by the French author Jean Bruller